FNW may refer to:

 Fairy Meadow railway station, in New South Wales, Australia
 Farnworth railway station, in England
 First North Western, a defunct English train operator
 FreeNetWorld International Film Fest
 Frum News Wire, an American news hotline